Raag may refer to
 Rāga, a melodic framework in Indian classical music
 Raag (film), a 2014 Assamese language drama film
 Raag (surname)
 Radio Amateur Association of Greece
 Right-angled Artin groups, a class of groups studied in geometric group theory